Giannis Vlachogiannis or Vlachos (Nafpaktos,  27 July 1867 – Athens, 23 August 1945) was a Greek historian and writer.

References

External links

Biographies 
 Ε.ΚΕ.ΒΙ. Registry of Greek Writers
 Library of the University of Crete
 Eleutherotypia
 Council of Aetoloakarnanians of Peristeri "Cosmas of Aetolia"

Works 
 His works from the National Book Center
 

Greek writers
20th-century Greek historians
People from Nafpaktos
1867 births
1945 deaths